The Acorn is a peer-reviewed academic journal sponsored by the Gandhi-King Society. It explores philosophical issues related to non-violence in theory and practice, with a focus on the work of M. K. Gandhi and Martin Luther King, Jr. Notable contributors include Thich Nhat Hanh, Ham Seok-heon, and Michael N. Nagler. The journal was established in 1986 by Ha Poong Kim, and is produced in the philosophy department at St. Bonaventure University. It is available online from the Philosophy Documentation Center.

See also 
 List of philosophy journals
 List of political science journals

External links
 
 The Acorn online
 Philosophy Documentation Center

Biannual journals
English-language journals
Political philosophy journals
Political science journals
Publications established in 1986
1986 establishments in New York (state)
Philosophy Documentation Center academic journals
Journals about philosophers